Detroit 2 is the fifth studio album by American rapper Big Sean, released through GOOD Music on September 4, 2020, with distribution handled by Def Jam Recordings. The album serves as a sequel to Sean's 2012 mixtape, Detroit. It features guest appearances from Eminem, Royce da 5'9", Dwele, Post Malone, Young Thug, Travis Scott, Lil Wayne, Diddy, Kash Doll, and Nipsey Hussle, among others. The deluxe edition includes additional features from ASAP Ferg and Hit-Boy.

The album received generally positive reviews from music critics and was a commercial success. It debuted at number one on the US Billboard 200 chart, earning 103,000 album-equivalent units in its first week.

Release and promotion
Big Sean had originally planned to announce the album on March 13, 2020, coinciding with "313 Day", an annual celebration of Detroit; however, this announcement was delayed due to the COVID-19 pandemic. Sean instead announced the album later in March, with no release date specified. In late August, Sean announced over Twitter that the release date of the album would be September 4, 2020. The album is Sean's final album released under Kanye West's Def Jam-distributed imprint, GOOD Music.

Singles
"Deep Reverence" featuring American rapper Nipsey Hussle, was released on August 25, 2020, as the album's lead single. The music video was released on March 5, 2021. The song peaked at number 82 on the US Billboard Hot 100.

The album's second single, "Wolves" featuring American singer Post Malone, was sent to rhythmic contemporary radio on September 19, 2020. The music video was released on November 20, 2020. The song peaked at number 65 on the Billboard Hot 100.

Promotional singles
The album's first promotional single, "Harder than My Demons", was released on August 31, 2020, as well an accompanying music video. The song peaked at number four on the US Bubbling Under Hot 100.

Other songs
The music video for "Lithuania" featuring American rapper Travis Scott, was released on September 4, 2020. The music video for "ZTFO", was released on September 17, 2020. The music video for "Body Language" featuring American singers Ty Dolla Sign and Jhené Aiko, was released on December 16, 2020.

Critical reception

Detroit 2 was met with generally positive reviews. At Metacritic, which assigns a normalized rating out of 100 to reviews from professional publications, the album received an average score of 71, based on eight reviews. Aggregator AnyDecentMusic? gave it 6.4 out of 10, based on their assessment of the critical consensus.

Fred Thomas of AllMusic praised the album, stating, "The production is clean and engaging, with polished beats and the occasional glossy hook providing a contrast for Big Sean's visceral rhymes and urgently delivered performances". Reviewing the album for Clash, Robin Murray stated, "Detroit 2 has that passion, that willingness to progress. Equal parts entertaining and wide, it finds the rapper coming full circle, only to find himself once more". In a positive review, A. D. Amorosi of Variety wrote that "Big Sean makes Detroit 2 a real and righteous place, even if he has to use a handful of holy clichés to prove it". Rashad Grove of Consequence said, "Undoubtedly, Big Sean's growth as an artist and, more importantly, as a human being is the scarlet thread that ties Detroit 2 together. The complexity of the human experience, as told from the vast experiences of Sean's own life, comes shining through". HipHopDXs reviewer Mark Elibert stated in his review that "Detroit 2 shows when Big Sean opens up and tells his story he's an artist worthy of being in the conversation of the best of his era. He just needs to come back stronger with more airtight songs and not attempt to attract every audience that's out there".

In a lukewarm review, NMEs Will Lavin wrote, "Although it can be overblown, Sean's passion is unreserved here, the record peppered with Instagram-worthy captions that urge listeners to take inspiration from their surroundings while keeping friends and family close. This is why Sean's name continues to stay on the lips of rap connoisseurs almost a decade after his debut". In a mixed review, Pitchforks Drew Millard stated: "On his fifth solo album, Big Sean gets personal, leans on a slate of high-profile guests to provide most of the entertainment, and struggles to deliver anything that isn't fundamentally embarrassing."

Year-end lists

Commercial performance
Detroit 2 debuted at number one on the US Billboard 200 with 103,000 album-equivalent units (including 30,000 pure album sales) in its first week. This became Sean's third US number-one debut and his seventh top-ten album. The album also accumulated a total of 93.55 million on-demand US streams from all its tracks, in the week ending September 19, 2020. In its second week, the album dropped to number seven on the chart, earning an additional 37,000 units.

Track listing

Notes
  signifies a co-producer
  signifies an additional producer
 "Feed" is stylized in all caps

Sample credits
  "Lucky Me" contains samples of "Bingung", written by Benny Soebardja, as performed by Shark Move.
  "Body Language" contains samples of "Soulful Moaning", written and performed by Shawn Demean Harris.
  "Full Circle" contains samples of "Baby's Paradise", written by Didier Marouani, and performed by Space.
  "Time In" contains samples of "Too Deep", written by Anthony Paul Jeffries, Daniel Daley, Majid Al Maskati, Maneesh Bidaye, Stephen Garrett, Benjamin Bush and Timothy Mosley, as performed by Dvsn.
  "The Baddest" contains samples of "Gojira Tai Mosura", written and performed by Akira Ifukube, taken from the motion picture soundtrack of Godzilla vs. Mothra.
  "Don Life" contains samples of "Human Nature", written by John Bettis and Steve Porcaro, as performed by Michael Jackson.
  "Friday Night Cypher" contains samples of "Grindin', written by Gene Thornton, Terrence Thornton, Pharrell Williams and Chad Hugo, as performed by Clipse; and samples from "We Gonna Make It", written by Jason Phillips, David Styles, Alan Maman and Samuel Johnson, as performed by Jadakiss, which itself samples "My Music", written and performed by Jackson.
  "Single Again" contains samples of "I Wish", written by Mike City and Carl Thomas, as performed by Carl Thomas.

Personnel
Musicians

 Comic J Will – additional vocals (3)
 Johan Lenox – additional vocals (3, 18), string arrangement (3, 8, 18, 24), programming (8, 18), keyboards (18)
 Yasmeen Al-Mazeedi – violin (3, 8, 18, 24)
 ASAP Rocky – additional vocals (4)
 Gregg Rominiecki – additional vocals (4)
 Rogét Chahayed – keyboards (6, 15, 20)
 Dave Chappelle – spoken word (6)
 Anthony "Jawan" McEastland – background vocals (7)
 Chelsea West – background vocals (7)
 Justin Bieber – background vocals (7)
 Nikki Grier – background vocals (7)
 James Anderson – additional vocals (8, 16)
 David Young – horn (8)
 Travis Scott – additional vocals (9)
 No I.D. – drums (9), drum programming (17)
 Keith Sweat – additional vocals (14)
 Erykah Badu – spoken word (15)
 Kyle Stewart – additional vocals (18)
 Meek Mill – additional vocals (18)
 Stevie Wonder – spoken word (20)
 Kierra Sheard – background vocals (21)
 Marc Bolin – sousaphone (21), tuba (21)
 Lemar Guillary – trombone (21)
 Darhyl "DJ" Camper Jr. – trumpet (21)
 Dontae Winslow – trumpet (21)
 Emile Martinez – trumpet (21)
 Michael Cotton – trumpet (21)
 Jhené Aiko – background vocals (24)
 Ty Dolla Sign – background vocals (24)

Technical

 Colin Leonard – mastering engineer (all tracks)
 Gregg Rominiecki – mixer (1–5, 7–14, 16–18, 20, 21, 23, 25), recording engineer (1–5, 7–14, 16–21, 23–25), recording arranger (19)
 Manny Marroquin – mixer (19)
 Tom Kahre – recording engineer (1–5, 7–14, 16–21, 23), vocal producer (5, 12), recording arranger (19)
 Hit-Boy – recording engineer (3), recording arranger (19)
 Barrington Hall – recording engineer (19)
 Omar Loya – recording engineer (19)
 Witt – recording arranger (19)
 Alec Foss – assistant mixer (1, 2, 4, 5, 11, 12, 18)
 Hector Fernandez – assistant mixer (3, 8–10, 13, 14, 16, 17, 21)
 Andy Gurerrero – assistant mixer (4, 18)
 David Kim – mixer (23), recording engineer (25)
 Jaycen Josahu – mixer (24)
 DJ Riggins – assistant mixer (24)
 Jacob Richards – assistant mixer (24)
 Mike Seaberg – assistant mixer (24)

Charts

Weekly charts

Year-end charts

Certifications

References

2020 albums
Big Sean albums
GOOD Music albums
Sequel albums
Def Jam Recordings albums
Albums produced by Boi-1da
Albums produced by DJ Dahi
Albums produced by Hit-Boy
Albums produced by No I.D.
Albums produced by Cool & Dre
Albums produced by DJ Mustard
Albums produced by Mike Will Made It
Albums produced by Take a Daytrip